Ceroglossus chilensis, the Chilean magnificent beetle, is a species of beetle of the family Carabidae.

Subspecies
 Ceroglossus chilensis angolicus Kraatz-Koschlau, 1888 
 Ceroglossus chilensis chilensis Escholtz, 1829 
 Ceroglossus chilensis colchaguensis Reed, 1875 
 Ceroglossus chilensis cyanicollis Kraatz, 1887 
 Ceroglossus chilensis evenoui Jiroux, 1996 
 Ceroglossus chilensis fallaciosus Kraatz, 1880 
 Ceroglossus chilensis ficheti Jiroux, 1996 
 Ceroglossus chilensis galvezi Jaffrézic & Rataj, 2006 
 Ceroglossus chilensis germaini Jiroux, 1996 
 Ceroglossus chilensis gloriosus Gerstaecker, 1858 
 Ceroglossus chilensis jaffrezici Jiroux, 2006 
 Ceroglossus chilensis keithi Jiroux, 1997 
 Ceroglossus chilensis kraatzianus Morawitz, 1886 
 Ceroglossus chilensis latemarginatus Kraatz-Koschlau, 1889 
 Ceroglossus chilensis legrandi Heinz & Jiroux, 2001 
 Ceroglossus chilensis meridionalis Heinz & Jiroux, 2001 
 Ceroglossus chilensis mochae (Reed, 1874) 
 Ceroglossus chilensis nigritulus Mandl, 1977 
 Ceroglossus chilensis pseudopatagonensis Heinz & Jiroux, 2001 
 Ceroglossus chilensis pseudovillaricensis Jiroux & Ugarte Peňa, 2006 
 Ceroglossus chilensis rataji Jiroux, 2006 
 Ceroglossus chilensis resplendens Jaffrézic & Rataj, 2006 
 Ceroglossus chilensis sculpturatus Jiroux & Rataj, 2006 
 Ceroglossus chilensis seladonicus Kraatz-Koschlau, 1887 
 Ceroglossus chilensis solieri Roeschke, 1900 
 Ceroglossus chilensis villaricensis Kraatz-Koschlau, 1885

Description
This species presents a marked sexual dimorphism as males have a wider proepisternum than females, while females have wider abdominal sternites. These beetles show also chromatic polymorphism, great genetic variations and morphological variability in shape and in size depending on subspecies and populations. Body color may be metallic green, brown, reddish or bluish.

Distribution and habitat
This species can be found in Chile and it is the most widespread Ceroglossus in the area. It mainly lives in native forests, in surrounding exotic plantations and in plantations of Pinus radiata.

References
 Biolib
 Carabidae of the world
 Paula Henríquez, Denise S. Donoso, Audrey A. Grez  Population density, sex ratio, body size and fluctuating asymmetry of Ceroglossus chilensis (Carabidae) in the fragmented Maulino forest and surrounding pine plantations
 Hugo Benitez De La FUENTE, Marcela VIDAL, Raul BRIONES, Viviane JEREZ  Sexual Dimorphism and Morphological Variation in Populations of Ceroglossus chilensis (Eschscholtz, 1829)(Coleoptera: Carabidae) 

Carabinae
Beetles described in 1829
Endemic fauna of Chile